Taylorsville may refer to several places in the United States:

 Taylorsville, California
 Taylorsville, Georgia
 Taylorsville, Indiana
 Taylorsville, Kentucky
 Taylorsville, Maryland
 Taylorsville, Mississippi
 Taylorsville, North Carolina
 Taylorsville, Ohio
 Taylorsville, Tennessee
 Taylorsville, Texas
 Taylorsville, Utah, the largest city with the name
 Taylorsville Dam on the Great Miami River, Dayton, Ohio

See also
 Taylorville (disambiguation)